Tryst may refer to:

Art and entertainment
 Tryst (novel), a 1939 novel by Elswyth Thane
 Tryst (play), a 2006 play by Karoline Leach
 Tryst (album), a 2019 studio album by Kate Ceberano and Paul Grabowsky
 "Tryst", a song by John Ireland from his 1928 composition Two Songs, 1928
 Trysts, a 2001 collection of short stories by Steve Berman

Other uses
 Tryst, a defunct nightclub at the Wynn Las Vegas hotel

See also 
 Cinq à sept 
 Trist
 Trysting tree